Agneta (also spelt Agnete, Agnetha, or Agnethe) is a Scandinavian variant of the feminine given name Agnes. It was derived from Latin and is the ablative case attached form of Agnes.

Notable people

Agneta
 Agneta Andersson (born 1961), Swedish canoer
 Agneta Berliner (born 1958), Swedish politician
 Agneta Bolme Börjefors (1941–2008), Swedish television presenter
 Agneta Börjesson (born 1957), Swedish politician
 Agneta Eckemyr (1950-2018), Swedish actress
 Agneta Eriksson (born 1965), Swedish swimmer
 Agnetha Fältskog (born 1950), Swedish singer and ABBA member
 Agneta Frieberg (1945–1971), Swedish fashion model
 Agneta Gille (born 1956), Swedish politician
 Agneta de Graeff van Polsbroek (1603–1656), Dutch patrician
 Agneta Horn (1628–1672), Swedish writer
 Agneta Lindskog (born 1953), Swedish luger
 Agneta Lundberg (born 1947), Swedish politician
 Agneta Luttropp (born 1945), Swedish politician
 Agneta Marell (born 1964), Swedish professor
 Agneta Matthes (1847–1909), Dutch entrepreneur 
 Agneta Mårtensson (born 1961), Swedish swimmer
 Agneta Månsson, Swedish skier
 Agneta Pleijel (born 1940), Swedish novelist
 Agneta Prytz (1916–2008), Swedish actress
 Agneta Ringman (born 1949), Swedish politician
 Agneta Sjödin (born 1967), Swedish television presenter
 Agneta Willeken (1497–1562), German mistress

Agnete
Agnete Bræstrup (1909–1992), Danish physician
Agnete Carlsen (born 1971), Norwegian footballer
Agnethe Davidsen (1947–2007), Greenlandic politician 
Agnete Friis (writer) (born 1974), Danish writer
Agnete Friis (badminton), Danish badminton player
Agnete Hegelund (born 1988), Danish fashion model
Agnete Hoy (1914–2000), English potter
Agnete Johnsen (born 1994), Norwegian singer and songwriter
Agnete Laustsen (1935–2018), Danish politician
Agnete Olsen (1909–1997), Danish swimmer

Other
 Agnetapark, a park in Delft, Netherlands

References

Swedish feminine given names
Scandinavian feminine given names
Latin words and phrases